This is the discography of American rapper Big Lurch.

Albums

Studio albums
It's All Bad
Released: March 16, 2004
Label: Blackmarket Records

With Cosmic Slop Shop
Da Family
Released:  June 2, 1998
Chart positions: –

Mixtapes & Compilations
3XL Vol. 1
Released: 1999
It's All Bad: Greatest Hits
Already! Vol. 1
Released: 2012
My Ghetto Hits
Released: 2013

As featured performer
 "How We Comin'" (Southern Fried Mix) - RBL Posse Ft. Big Lurch & Mystikal
 "Fire" - Mac Dre Ft. Harm & Big Lurch
 "Break 'Um Off" - C-Bo Ft. Big Lurch
 "Can I Take You Home" - Roguer Troutman II Ft. Big Lurch
 "Real Ones" - DJ U-Neek Ft. Big Bone & Big Lurch
 "How We Comin'" (West Side Mix) - RBL Posse Ft. Big Lurch & Mystikal
 "Deeper & Deeper" - T-Luni Ft. Big Lurch & Mister Spence
 "Sexuality" - Marvaless Ft. Big Lurch
 "Gimme Yo Sak" - Lil Ric & Laroo Ft. Big Lurch, Mob Figaz & Mr. Brainy
 "If You Want It" - T-Luni Ft. Big Lurch & Mister Spence
 "Thrilla" - Kali's Finest Ft. Big Lurch
 "Repercussions" - DJ U-Neek Ft. Big Lurch & Big Bone
 "Those Who Oppose" - Fatal Konnection Ft. Big Lurch
 "Bad Behavior" - Luni Coleone Ft. Big Lurch
 "Rydas" - Keak Da Sneak Ft. Big Lurch & Mondy Moe
 "Playa Shit" (Remix) - Vell Bacardi Ft. The Conscious Daughters, Big Lurch & Mac Mall
 "Sad Millionaire" - Yukmouth Ft. Phats Bossi & Big Lurch
 "Record Haters" - E-40 Ft. Big Lurch
 "Can U Deal With This" - C-Bo Ft. T-Nutty, Big Lurch, Killa Tay & Roger Troutman II
 "All Head No Body" - 187 Fac Ft. Spice 1, Big Lurch, B-Legit, V-Dal & Almond
 "Closet Nigga" - E-A-Ski Ft. Big Lurch
 "Way U Feel" - Kokane Ft. Big Lurch
 "That Feeling" - Bugzy Ft. Big Lurch
 "Somebody's Watching Me" - TQ Ft. Yukmouth & Big Lurch
 "Some Love" - Herm Lewis Ft. Big Lurch & Doonie Baby
 "Mob Life" - Certified Ft. Big Lurch
 "Dirty Game" - Tone Capone Ft. Big Lurch
 "Nigga Riches" - Big Lurch Ft. Spook Thee Man
 "No Competition" - Neva Legal Ft. Big Lurch & Chunk
 "Playa Shit" - Vicious Ft. Big Lurch
 "Paper Route" - J-Cutt Ft. Big Lurch
 "Remember Me" - RBX Ft. Sweet Lou Collins & Big Lurch
 "Could God Be A G?" - LA Nash Ft. Big Lurch
 "State Your Occupation" - Death BIV Di$honEr Ft. Big Lurch
 "Monopoly" Ft. Marvaless, C-Bo & Cosmic Slop Shop
 "Hard Labor" - C-Bo Ft. Outlawz & Big Lurch
 "God Takes Notes" - Big Lurch Ft. Spook Thee Man

References

Hip hop discographies
Discographies of American artists